Charles Walter Stuart, 12th Lord Blantyre, DL (21 December 1818 – 15 December 1900), styled Master of Blantyre from birth until 1830, was a Scottish politician and landowner with .

Born at Lennoxlove House, Stuart was the second son of Robert Stuart, 11th Lord Blantyre and his wife Fanny Mary, the second daughter of the Hon. John Rodney, younger son of George Brydges Rodney, 1st Baron Rodney.  In 1830 at the age of only twelve, he succeeded his father as lord. Stuart entered the British Army and was commissioned into the Grenadier Guards. He was appointed a Deputy Lieutenant of Renfrewshire in 1845 and was elected a Representative Peer in 1850.

On 4 October 1843, he married Evelyn, the second daughter of George Sutherland-Leveson-Gower, 2nd Duke of Sutherland at Trentham, Staffordshire and had by her five daughters and a son, Walter, who predeceased him.

Mary (b. 15 September 1845-21 November 1910), unmarried.
Ellen (31 Aug. 1846-19 April 1927), who married Sir David Baird, 3rd Baronet and together had six children.
Hon. Evelyn (24 June 1848 – 26 July 1888), who married Archibald Kennedy, 3rd Marquess of Ailsa. They had five children.
Gertrude (11 Nov. 1849-25 April 1935), married William Henry Gladstone MP, son of Prime Minister William Ewart Gladstone. They had two daughters, and one son, William Glynne Charles Gladstone.
Capt. Walter (17 Jul 1851-15 Mar 1895), Master of Blantyre. Unmarried.

Stuart's wife died in Nice in 1869 and he survived her until 1900, dying aged 81 at Erskine House, which subsequently became Erskine Hospital (now a hotel, renamed Mar Hall). The lordship became extinct on his death.

See also

Clan Stewart

References

1818 births
1900 deaths
Deputy Lieutenants of Renfrewshire
Lords of Parliament
Scottish representative peers
Grenadier Guards officers
19th-century Scottish landowners
19th-century Scottish businesspeople